The genus of the myrrhs, Commiphora, is the most species-rich genus of flowering plants in the frankincense and myrrh family, Burseraceae. The genus contains approximately 190 species of shrubs and trees, which are distributed throughout the (sub-) tropical regions of Africa, the western Indian Ocean islands, the Arabian Peninsula, India, and South America. The genus is drought-tolerant and common throughout the xerophytic scrub, seasonally dry tropical forests, and woodlands of these regions.

The common name myrrh refers to several species of the genus, from which aromatic resins are derived for various fragrance and medicinal uses by humans.

Description
Leaves in Commiphora are pinnately compound (or very rarely unifoliolate). Many species are armed with spines. Bark is often exfoliating, peeling in thin sheets to reveal colorful, sometimes photosynthetic, bark below. Stems are frequently succulent, especially in species native to drier environments. Flowers are typically dioecious (subdioecious) and fruits are drupes, usually with a 2-locular ovary (one is abortive). In response to wounding, the stems of many species will exude aromatic resins.

Ecology and biogeography
Commiphora can serve as a model genus for understanding plant evolution in the drier regions of the Old World tropics, particularly in eastern continental Africa and Madagascar, where diversity in the genus is concentrated. The closely related sister genus to Commiphora, Bursera, has been used as a model genus to study patterns of evolution in the New World seasonally dry tropical forests.

Use by humans
Products from many species of Commiphora have been used for various purposes, sometimes as timber, building material, and natural fencing, but more often valued for the aromatic resins produced by several members of the genus. "Myrrh", the common name for these dried resins, is fragrant and has been used both as fragrance and for medicinal purposes (e.g., Balsam of Mecca, C. gileadensis). Use of myrrh resin is frequent and pronounced throughout historical texts of cultural significance, including the Bible.

Systematics and taxonomy
Recent studies using DNA sequence data have confirmed the monophyly of Commiphora; however, this data suggests that previous classification of the genus into sections does not reflect monophyletic interspecific relationships.

Species
Species include:
 Commiphora africana (A.Rich.) Engl. (syn. Heudelotia africana), sometimes identified with ancient bdellium. Used indirectly by the San bushmen to poison their arrow tips for hunting 
 Commiphora alaticaulis J.B.Gillett & Vollesen
 Commiphora angolensis Engl., also known as "sand commiphora", growing mainly in Angola and Namibia
 Commiphora aprevalii Guillaumin, endemic to Madagascar
 Commiphora boranensis Vollesen
 Commiphora caudata (Wight & Arn.) Engl.
 Commiphora ciliata Vollesen
 Commiphora confusa Vollesen
 Commiphora corrugata  J.B.Gillett & Vollesen
 Commiphora erosa Vollesen
 Commiphora gileadensis (L.) C.Chr. (syn. Commiphora opobalsamum), producing balsam of Mecca.
 Commiphora glandulosa Schinz
 Commiphora guidottii Chiov. ex Guid. (syn. Commiphora sessiliflora), producing habak hadi, known as bisabol, opoponax, scented or sweet myrrh.
 Commiphora guillauminii H.Perrier
 Commiphora habessinica (O.Berg) Engl.
 Commiphora harveyi (Engl.) Engl.
 Commiphora humbertii H.Perrier
 Commiphora kataf (Forssk.) Engl.(syn. Commiphora holtziana Engl, Commiphora erythraea (Ehrenb.) Engl.), producing habak hagar, known as sweet myrrh, sometimes sold as opoponax.
 Commiphora kua (R.Br. ex Royle) Vollesen
 Commiphora leptophloeos (Mart.) J.B.Gillett, the only species of Commiphora present in the Americas.
 Commiphora madagascariensis Jacq.
 Commiphora monoica Vollesen
 Commiphora mafaidoha
 Commiphora mossambicensis (Oliv.) Engl.
 Commiphora myrrha (Nees) Engl. (syn. Commiphora molmol), producing myrrh. 
 Commiphora saxicola Engl., Rock corkwood, a shrub endemic to Namibia
 Commiphora schimperi (O.Bergman) Engl.
 Commiphora simplicifolia H.Perrier
 Commiphora sphaerocarpa Chiov
 Commiphora stocksiana (Engl.) Engl., known in Pakistan as bayisa gugal
 Commiphora unilobata J.B.Gillett & Vollesen
 Commiphora wightii (Arn.) Bhandari (syn. Commiphora mukul), producing gum guggul, sometimes identified with ancient bdellium.

Gallery

References

External links

Flora of Pakistan: Commiphora
Biblical Burseraceae

 
Burseraceae genera
Dioecious plants